In Greek mythology, Phlogius (Ancient Greek: Φλογίῳ or Φλογίον) may refer to the following personages:

 Phlogius, one of the Dolionians, people of northwestern Asia Minor visited by the Argonauts, killed by the Dioscuri.
 Phlogius, a Triccan prince as son of King Deimachus of Thessaly, and brothers to Autolycus, Demoleon (Deileon), and sometimes Phronius. These men joined Heracles in his expedition against the Amazons but they never returned and settled in Sinope. Later on, they joined the Argonauts.
 Phlogius, son of Eulaeus, who an Indian chieftain who armed himself against Dionysus during the Indian war.
 Phlogius, son of Strophius, who followed Dionysus in his Indian campaign and was killed by Morrheus.

Notes

References 

 Apollonius Rhodius, Argonautica translated by Robert Cooper Seaton (1853-1915), R. C. Loeb Classical Library Volume 001. London, William Heinemann Ltd, 1912. Online version at the Topos Text Project.
 Apollonius Rhodius, Argonautica. George W. Mooney. London. Longmans, Green. 1912. Greek text available at the Perseus Digital Library.
 Gaius Valerius Flaccus, Argonautica translated by Mozley, J H. Loeb Classical Library Volume 286. Cambridge, MA, Harvard University Press; London, William Heinemann Ltd. 1928. Online version at theio.com.
 Gaius Valerius Flaccus, Argonauticon. Otto Kramer. Leipzig. Teubner. 1913. Latin text available at the Perseus Digital Library.
 Nonnus of Panopolis, Dionysiaca translated by William Henry Denham Rouse (1863-1950), from the Loeb Classical Library, Cambridge, MA, Harvard University Press, 1940.  Online version at the Topos Text Project.
 Nonnus of Panopolis, Dionysiaca. 3 Vols. W.H.D. Rouse. Cambridge, MA., Harvard University Press; London, William Heinemann, Ltd. 1940–1942. Greek text available at the Perseus Digital Library.
 The Orphic Argonautica, translated by Jason Colavito. © Copyright 2011. Online version at the Topos Text Project.

Characters in Greek mythology